"Victim of Love" is a song by the American new wave band the Cars, appearing on their fourth studio album, Shake It Up. It was written by Ric Ocasek.

Release and reception
"Victim of Love" was first released on Shake It Up in November 1981. However, in June the next year, it was released as the third American single from Shake It Up (the first two being "Shake It Up" and "Since You're Gone"). Although the song did not chart on the Billboard Hot 100, it hit #39 on the Mainstream Rock chart. The single was not released in Britain; another track from Shake It Up, "Think It Over", was released as a single instead.

AllMusic critic Greg Prato described the track as "pop-oriented" and listed it as one of "many lesser-known album tracks [that] prove[d] to be highlights [on Shake It Up]."

B-side
The B-side of "Victim of Love" is the Greg Hawkes-Ric Ocasek written track, "This Could Be Love". The song appeared on the second side of the Shake It Up album.

Charts

References

1981 songs
1982 singles
The Cars songs
Songs written by Ric Ocasek
Song recordings produced by Roy Thomas Baker
Elektra Records singles